The following is a list of MTV Pilipinas winners for Best Song or Favorite Song, depending on what year the award was given. The last of this award was given out in 2005.

References

MTV Pilipinas Music Awards
Song awards